Abortion in Maryland is legal up to the point of fetal viability or when necessary to preserve the life or health of the pregnant person. The first laws regulating abortion in the state were passed in 1867 and 1868, banning abortion except by a physician to "secure the safety of the mother." Abortion providers continued to operate, with a robust network of referrals from regular physicians to "skilled abortionists" such as Dr. George Lotrell Timanus, who practiced from the 1920s through the 1950s in Baltimore. Medical and legal enforcement became more strict from the 1940s through 60s, with numerous police raids on abortion providers. In 1968, Maryland passed a liberalized abortion law that clarified the wording of the previous law, allowing abortion in hospital settings in cases of rape, severe fetal deformity, or when life and health were endangered.

The Roe v. Wade ruling in 1973 made abortion legal without restrictions until the third trimester of pregnancy, overruling Maryland law. After Roe, clinics opened in the state to provide abortions outside of hospitals, and Planned Parenthood began providing outpatient abortion services. In 1991 the Maryland General Assembly passed a law that codified Roe v. Wade, guaranteeing the right to abortion. Anti-abortion groups successfully petitioned to bring the law to a public referendum. Question 6, to uphold the abortion rights bill, passed in 1992 with 62% of voters in favor and 38% opposed.

Dobbs v. Jackson Women's Health Organization overturned the federally-protected right to abortion in 2022; abortion remains legal in Maryland, and the Maryland General Assembly passed the Abortion Care Access Act, expanding the types of healthcare providers who can perform abortions and funding increased training. An amendment to enshrine abortion rights in the state constitution has been approved by the House of Delegates; it would require approval by the state senate and a voter referendum to be enacted.

In a 2014 poll by the Pew Research Center, 64% of Maryland adults said that abortion should be legal in all / most cases and 33% said that it should be illegal in all or most cases.

History

Historical Practices 
Abortion has been documented since the colonial period in Maryland. Abortion practices included the use of herbal remedies such as opium, savin (see Juniperus Sabina) and other herbs that caused the body to "purge". These practices are mainly recorded in the context of legal proceedings, such as a 1663 case in which a Maryland doctor was accused of administering an abortifacient to a servant he impregnated, though the case was not prosecuted.

Other herbal remedies included snakeroot, (also known as Polygala senega), to induce abortion. A medical student at the University of Pennsylvania by the name of Thomas Massie  wrote in his 1803 doctoral dissertation that snakeroot was used as an abortifacient, citing a physician in Harford County, Maryland who reported its use among the rural population there.

Midwives also performed abortions throughout the nineteenth and early twentieth centuries. Progressive-era public health reformers in Baltimore sought to restrict midwifery, and conducted a survey in 1909 in which they claimed that 32% of the city's midwives were "suspected of criminal practice," that is, of providing abortion services. This Progressive coalition was made up of white, middle-class physicians, nurses, and female reformers, such as doctors Mary Sherwood and Lilian Welsh, who characterized midwifery and abortion as vices of the immigrant and African American lower classes. Historian Leslie Reagan points out that physicians were also performing abortions at this time, but sought to direct enforcement towards midwives and lower-class patients.

Legislative history 
Both medical and procedural abortion were widely practiced throughout the United States in the early 19th century, often by midwives, homeopaths, and others without medical degrees. By the 1850s, physicians wished to push these practitioners out of the medical marketplace and assert greater control over reproduction and gender roles. Maryland was listed among states with no criminal abortion law by Dr. Horatio Storer, a leader of the campaign by physicians to enact abortion bans. The first law regulating abortion in Maryland was passed in 1867 and completely banned the procedure, but there was no enabling clause in the bill, leaving it unenforceable. A second law was passed in 1868, banning abortion except by a physician, after consulting "one or more respectable physicians," to "secure the safety of the mother."

From the 1930s onward, physicians began seeking greater authority to determine the need for therapeutic abortion without risking legal consequences. This reform movement influenced the American Law Institute (ALI) Model Penal Code of 1962, which proposed legalizing abortion to preserve the health (whether physical or mental) of the mother, as well as if the pregnancy is due to incest or rape, or if doctors agree that there is a significant risk that the child will be born with a serious mental or physical defect. A law derived from the ALI Model Penal Code was passed in Maryland in 1968. 

On May 26, 1970, Governor Marvin Mandel vetoed legislation that would have removed all state restrictions on abortions. Mandel cited concerns that the bill included no residency requirement, that the partner and/or parent(s) of the pregnant person would not be notified, and that the law would "allow an abortion, even in the eighth or ninth month of pregnancy". Heavy lobbying surrounded the bill. The medical community advocated for its passing while the Catholic Church lobbied against it.

The Roe v. Wade ruling in 1973, which legalized abortion until the third trimester of pregnancy, overruled Maryland's previous abortion laws. During the 1970s, three Maryland laws attempted to place restrictions on abortion access: a 1975 law banned referral fees to abortion referral agencies; a 1977 parental notification law was ruled unconstitutional; a 1979 "information before abortion" law required abortion-seekers to be given a pamphlet promoting alternatives.

In 1991 Maryland passed a law, signed by Governor William Donald Shaeffer, that codified Roe v. Wade, guaranteeing the right to abortion and repealing the earlier "information before abortion" act. Anti-abortion groups successfully petitioned to bring the law to a public referendum. Question 6, to uphold the abortion rights bill, passed in 1992 with 62% of voters in favor and 38% opposed.

In Maryland in 2013, according to The New York Times, something "rare in this era of polarized abortion politics" occurred when laws that significantly tightened the licensing and inspection of abortion clinics were supported by those on both sides of the abortion issue.

Two bills for six-week abortion bans, called "fetal heartbeat bills" by proponents, were filed in the Maryland House of Delegates in 2019. On February 8, 2019, Ric Metzgar filed HB 933. On February 8, 2019, Robin L. Grammer, Jr. filed HB 978, a bill entitled "Keep Our Hearts Beating Act". In 2019, Former Maryland House Speaker Michael Busch proposed an amendment to the state's constitution to enshrine the right for women to have an abortion. His replacement, Maryland House Speaker Adrienne Jones, said she would try to re-introduce the amendment in 2020 in response to the abortion bans in the states of Alabama and Georgia.

In March 2022, the Maryland House of Delegates voted to enshrine a broad right to abortion access into the state constitution. The move was in response to the possibility that the more conservative leaning U.S. Supreme Court could weaken abortion right protections nationwide. The constitutional amendment needs approval by the Maryland Senate and the voters before being enacted. In April 2022, the Maryland General Assembly passed the Abortion Care Access Act. The bill  allows a broader range of healthcare workers—nurse practitioners, nurse midwives, and physician assistants—to perform abortions and allocates $3.5 million to a new program within the Maryland Department of Health to train healthcare workers. Additionally, the bill requires the majority of health insurance plans, including private health insurance plans, to cover abortions cost free. The legislation was enacted in 2022 with a gubernatorial veto override.

Judicial history 
Arrests of abortion providers became more common in Maryland from the 1940s through 60s with increased law enforcement. This led to notable criminal cases including the prosecutions and appeals of Dr. George Lotrell Timanus (Adams, Nelson, and Timanus vs. State), Dr. Milan Vuitch (Vuitch vs. State), and other physician and non-physician providers.

The US Supreme Court's decision in 1973's Roe v. Wade ruling meant the state could no longer regulate abortion until the third trimester. Previous abortion convictions under state law were overturned. However, the Supreme Court overturned Roe v. Wade in Dobbs v. Jackson Women's Health Organization, .

Clinic history 

Between 1982 and 1992, the number of abortion clinics in the state decreased by one, going from 52 in 1982 to 51 in 1992. 

In 2017, there were 25 abortion clinics in the state. In that same year, 71% of the counties in the state did not have an abortion clinic and 29% of women in the state aged 15–44 lived in a county without an abortion clinic. 

In 2017, there were nine Planned Parenthood clinics, five of which offered abortion services, in a state with a population of 1,416,615 women aged 15–49.

Barriers to access
Maryland is a state that has highly ranked reproductive rights protections, but there are still many barriers to safe and legal abortions. According to the Institute for Women's Policy Research, Maryland is ranked #3 across all fifty states for reproductive rights and received an A− rating.

Parental notification
In the state of Maryland, minors can obtain safe and legal abortions but a health care professional must provide parental notification to at least one parent or guardian before the abortion can be administered. This parent or guardian does not have to agree with the patient's choice, they just must be notified.  There are exceptions, including: if the minor is capable of giving their informed consent, if notification would not be in the best interest of the minor, if a reasonable attempt to give notification has been unsuccessful, if notice may lead to abuse towards the minor, or if the minor does not live with her parent or guardian.

The parental notification may be a deterrent for minors to get an abortion. The exceptions leave the decision in the hands of the abortion provider which creates uncertainty for the minors looking to get the procedure and might further be a deterrent. Additionally, the abortion providers might not decide to waive the parental notification for minors who need the procedure, proving the deterrent that this parental notification causes.

Clinic closures
Maryland currently has 25 abortion clinics open; however, The New York Times depicts multiple abortion providing clinic closing in Maryland from 2013 to 2018.  In 1981, there were a recorded 29.3 abortions out of every one thousand women aged 15–44, compared to 19.5 in 2005. Increased contraceptive use is only one contributor to abortions decreasing on a national level.

Safe and legal abortions are on a decrease but closing clinics is still a barrier to access for many people. The closing of clinics only stops safe and legal abortions. Studies prove that clinic closings lead to people attempting to performing their own unsafe abortions. Closures in clinics also lead to Google searches such as "self-induced abortions”, showing that the need for these procedures still exists. 20-50% of people who have unsafe abortions are hospitalized due to complications, introducing health concerns and also additional costs to both the people and the Maryland government that are greater than the cost of an abortion.

For the clinics that are still open, some do not offer abortions after 13 weeks. Maryland law states that abortions can be performed after or at viability if there is a fetal anomaly or the patient's life is at risk. Viability is, for the most part, considered 24 weeks. Although the Maryland law is protective of the mother's right to choose, clinics that only offer the procedure before 13 weeks introduce another barrier to access to safe and legal abortions. Additionally, rape and incest is not included as an exception after viability, which lends itself to be yet another barrier to safe and legal abortions for many in Maryland.

Clinic locations
{
  "type": "FeatureCollection",
  "features": [
    {
      "type": "Feature",
      "properties": {},
      "geometry": {
        "type": "Point",
        "coordinates": [
          -76.50923,
          38.97609
        ]
      }
    },
    {
      "type": "Feature",
      "properties": {},
      "geometry": {
        "type": "Point",
        "coordinates": [
          -76.08164,
          38.7872
        ]
      }
    },
    {
      "type": "Feature",
      "properties": {},
      "geometry": {
        "type": "Point",
        "coordinates": [
          -77.088058,
          38.964882
        ]
      }
    },
    {
      "type": "Feature",
      "properties": {},
      "geometry": {
        "type": "Point",
        "coordinates": [
          -77.12571,
          39.0262
        ]
      }
    },
    {
      "type": "Feature",
      "properties": {},
      "geometry": {
        "type": "Point",
        "coordinates": [
          -77.0288,
          39.0003
        ]
      }
    },
    {
      "type": "Feature",
      "properties": {},
      "geometry": {
        "type": "Point",
        "coordinates": [
          -77.15492,
          39.099706
        ]
      }
    },
    {
      "type": "Feature",
      "properties": {},
      "geometry": {
        "type": "Point",
        "coordinates": [
          -77.206768,
          39.17367
        ]
      }
    },
    {
      "type": "Feature",
      "properties": {},
      "geometry": {
        "type": "Point",
        "coordinates": [
          -77.405544,
          39.442212
        ]
      }
    },
    {
      "type": "Feature",
      "properties": {},
      "geometry": {
        "type": "Point",
        "coordinates": [
          -77.723821,
          39.643896
        ]
      }
    },
    {
      "type": "Feature",
      "properties": {},
      "geometry": {
        "type": "Point",
        "coordinates": [
          -77.723821,
          39.643896
        ]
      }
    },
    {
      "type": "Feature",
      "properties": {},
      "geometry": {
        "type": "Point",
        "coordinates": [
          -76.620075,
          39.29376
        ]
      }
    },
    {
      "type": "Feature",
      "properties": {},
      "geometry": {
        "type": "Point",
        "coordinates": [
          -76.489768,
          39.339108
        ]
      }
    },
    {
      "type": "Feature",
      "properties": {},
      "geometry": {
        "type": "Point",
        "coordinates": [
          -76.520182,
          39.36696
        ]
      }
    },
    {
      "type": "Feature",
      "properties": {},
      "geometry": {
        "type": "Point",
        "coordinates": [
          -76.576006,
          39.393558
        ]
      }
    },
    {
      "type": "Feature",
      "properties": {},
      "geometry": {
        "type": "Point",
        "coordinates": [
          -76.777738,
          39.413769
        ]
      }
    },
    {
      "type": "Feature",
      "properties": {},
      "geometry": {
        "type": "Point",
        "coordinates": [
          -76.741912,
          39.39028
        ]
      }
    },
    {
      "type": "Feature",
      "properties": {},
      "geometry": {
        "type": "Point",
        "coordinates": [
          -76.881620,
          38.613758
        ]
      }
    }
  ]
}Maryland has many clinics and providers that offer safe and legal abortions; as shown in the figure to the right, they are concentrated around Baltimore and Washington, D.C. As of 2017, over 70% of Maryland counties did not have a clinic or provider that provided abortions. These counties include almost 30% of Maryland women who do not have access to a safe and legal abortion within their own county.  Pro-choice activists have seen pregnant patients drive as far as three hours (from Salisbury to Baltimore) to complete the procedure, showing that clinic locations are a barrier to abortions for many Maryland people. Low income residents might not be able to take the time off from work, or pay for transportation, further showing the severity of this barrier.

Other noticeable legislation
Maryland has 38 crisis pregnancy centers with counselors working to convince pregnant patients away from abortions. In 2009, Baltimore City passed legislation to require crisis pregnancy centers (CPCs) to disclose their status and that they did not offer abortion services, but organizations representing the CPCs have been successful in courts challenging these laws, principally on the argument that forcing the CPCs to post such language violated their First Amendment rights and constituted compelled speech.

In 2018, a Federal Appeals court struck down a law that would've required Maryland clinics to clearly disclose in their waiting rooms if they do not offer or refer pregnant patients to abortion procedures because it was deemed unconstitutional. This, combined with the existence of the pregnancy centers, show lack of information/counseling as another barrier to abortion access for many people in Maryland.

On a national level, barriers exist that prevent Maryland patients from pursuing safe and legal abortions. Even before the Trump administration's 2019 restructure of Title X, federal funds could not be used for abortion services. The new Title X regulations restrict Title X providers from providing abortions within their clinic or referring patients to abortion providers unless they explicitly ask for the referral. Nationally, 4 million people rely on Title X (78% of these patients have incomes below 150% of the poverty level), and Maryland has since pulled out of the Title X network because of the new regulations and gag rule. This loss of funds has reduced Maryland's network capacity by 90-99%. Maryland has passed emergency funding measures to mitigate this funding loss, however it is not a long-term solution. The Title X changes introduce barriers to access to abortion because of the loss of funding for clinics and providers who provide abortions, but separately also rely on Title X to keep their doors open. The new regulations introduce another barrier because the gag rule limits how much information doctors can provide their patients about all of their choices, including obtaining safe and legal abortions.

Statistics 
In the period between 1972 and 1974, there were zero recorded illegal abortion deaths in the state. In 1990, 604,000 women in the state faced the risk of an unintended pregnancy. In 2014, 64% of adults said in a poll by the Pew Research Center that abortion should be legal and 33% said it should be illegal in all or most cases. In 2017, the state had an infant mortality rate of 6.4 deaths per 1,000 live births.

Abortion financing 

Seventeen states, including Maryland, use their own funds to cover all or most "medically necessary" abortions sought by low-income people under Medicaid; thirteen are required by State court orders to do so. In 2010, the state had 4,352  publicly funded abortions, of which zero were federally funded and 4,352  were state funded.

On January 19, 2023, on Governor Wes Moore's first day of office, he fulfilled a campaign promise to release $3.5 million in funds for abortion training, previously withheld by the former Republic governor.

Abortion rights views and activities

Violence 
On May 13, 2022, the Alpha Pregnancy Center in Reisterstown, Maryland was vandalized by “Jane’s Revenge,” the far-left group that claimed the Madison, WI arson attack. Among other graffiti, they wrote "If abortions aren't safe, neither are you."

Around May 14, 2022, the BirthRight pregnancy resource nonprofit in Frederick, Maryland was vandalized with pro-abortion graffiti.

Protests 
People from the state participated in marches supporting abortion rights as part of a #StoptheBans movement in May 2019.

Anti-abortion views and activities

Violence 
On July 7, 1984, eight weeks after a bomb threat to Planned Parenthood's state headquarters in Baltimore, MD the Annapolis Planned Parenthood office in Annapolis Maryland was bombed causing extensive damage. While no injuries were reported, there were broken windows, a hole opened in the front of the building and structural damage to the ceiling. The federal Bureau of Alcohol, Tobacco and Firearms investigated the possible connection to a July 4 explosion at the National Abortion Federation offices in Washington DC.

In January 1985 three men from Maryland; Thomas Eugene Spinks, Kenneth William Shields and Michael D. Bray were charged in connection with the bombing of the National Abortion Federation, and the bombing of Planned Parenthood of Maryland in Annapolis as well as six other Maryland, D.C, and Virginia area bombings; the bombings of the Hillcrest Clinic in Norfolk, Va., the Metropolitan Medical Women’s Center in Rockville, Md., the Randolph Medical Center in Wheaton, Md., the Metropolitan Family Planning Institute in Suitland, Md.; and the New Year’s Day bombing of the Hillcrest Women’s Surgi- Center in Washington D.C. All three men were found guilty; Shields sentenced to two years in prison, Bray ten years, and Spinks, considered the principal instigator, 15 years.

From February 24–25, 2016, Travis Reynolds, 21, vandalized a Baltimore-area women's health care clinic with anti-abortion graffiti. After being arrested, Reynolds "admitted to police that he defaced the clinic's doors, walls and windows because he thought that it would deter women from using the clinic." Reynolds pleaded guilty in federal court to one count of violating the Freedom of Access to Clinic Entrances Act in October 2016.

Anti-abortion assemblies 
The anti-abortion group 40 Days for Life conducts seasonal prayer campaigns outside abortion facilities in various Maryland cities. Individuals and groups sign up with 40 Days for Life to be present outside specific facilities for specific hours to pray for an end to abortion during each seasonal campaign.

References 

Maryland
Healthcare in Maryland
Women in Maryland